The 2016 Asian Indoor Athletics Championships was the seventh edition of the international indoor athletics event between Asian nations. It took place at the Aspire Dome in Doha, Qatar, between 19 and 21 February.

Three new women's Asian indoor records were set at the competition:  in the pole vault by Li Ling, 51.67 seconds for the 400 metres by Kemi Adekoya, and 3:35.07 minutes for the 4 × 400 metres relay set by Bahrain. In total, twelve championship records were improved at the competition. The host nation Qatar topped the medal table with six gold medals (all on the men's side). China was second with five gold medals and Kazakhstan had four titles to its name.

Five titles from the 2014 edition were defended successfully, including all the men's distance titles. Musaeb Abdulrahman Balla of Qatar won the 800 metres for a second title while his compatriot Mohamad Al-Garni retained both his 1500 metres and 3000 metres gold medals in championship record times. Another championship record defence came from Kuwait's Abdulaziz Al-Mandeel in the 60 metres hurdles. The two other athletes to defend their titles were both high jumpers: Mutaz Essa Barshim took his fourth straight men's title for the host nation and Svetlana Radzivil of Uzbekistan took the honour of being the only returning women's champion to leave undefeated.

Betlhem Desalegn took a women's distance double in the 1500 m and 3000 m, becoming the first Emirati gold medallist in championships history. Swapna Barman was initially the women's pentathlon runner-up, but was disqualified upon appeal for a lane infringement in the final 800 m event. Other prominent disqualifications were home favourites Samuel Francis and Tosin Ogunode, who fell foul of the false start rule in the men's 60 metres. Three infrequent participants reached the medal table for first time: the Philippines through men's 60 m bronze medallist Eric Cray, Sri Lanka courtesy of women's 800 m runner-up Nimali Waliwarsha Arachchige and men's high jump third-placer Manjula Kumara, and finally Jordan via their women's 4 × 400 m relay team.

Results

Men

Women

Medal table

Key

Participating nations

References

Results
Official results. AthleticsAsia. Retrieved on 2016-02-22.

External links
Official Asian Athletics Association website

2016
Asian Indoor Championships
Indoor Championships
Sports competitions in Doha
International athletics competitions hosted by Qatar
2016 in Qatari sport